Vadim Vasilyev (born 17 May 1972) is a retired Azerbaijani professional footballer who made his professional debut in 1993 for Khazri Eltaj.

International career
Vasilyev made his debut for Azerbaijan on 6 March 1999 against Estonia, coming on as a substitute for Gurban Gurbanov.

Career statistics

International

Statistics accurate as of 2 November 2015

International goals

Honours
Neftchi Baku
Azerbaijan Top League (1): 2003–04
Azerbaijan Cup (2): 2001–02, 2003–04
FC Baku
Azerbaijan Top League (1): 2005–06

References

External links
 
 
 
 

1972 births
Living people
Azerbaijani footballers
Azerbaijani expatriate footballers
Expatriate footballers in Ukraine
Azerbaijani expatriate sportspeople in Ukraine
Azerbaijani people of Russian descent
FC Shakhtar Shakhtarsk players
FC Metalurh Donetsk players
SC Tavriya Simferopol players
Ukrainian Premier League players
Ukrainian Second League players
Footballers from Baku
Association football forwards
Neftçi PFK players
Azerbaijan international footballers